Jaime Robbie "JR" Reyne is an Australian singer/songwriter and actor.

Personal life
Reyne's parents are the rock singer James Reyne and English-born model/stylist Kim Ellmer.  He was educated in Melbourne, Australia at Scotch College. He has a son.

Music career
Between 2003 and 2004 Reyne played solo gigs in London and festivals in Australia. 2005 saw the independent release of his debut solo acoustic EP, Tex Sessions. In 2006 he formed Jaime Robbie Reyne & The Paradise Three. In 2007 the band released their debut mini-Album, Fallen Flower, (through Green Media/MGM Distribution) to critical acclaim, from many publications including Rolling Stone (Australia). The release was followed up with a national tour and performances at festivals including St Kilda Festival, Queenscliff Music Festival, Sovereign Hill Music Festival and The Australian Country Music Muster. Reyne then formed the group, Rushcutter with Vincent Daniele (guitar), Tim Wheatley (bass) and Brett Wolfenden (drums) in 2008. Wheatley is the son of Glenn Wheatley, and manages the band. They soon started writing and producing demos and playing headline shows in Melbourne, before disembarking to the United States. Upon returning to Australia in early 2009, Rushcutter were signed to Mercury Records/Universal working with American producer Niko Bolas on their debut release, Call High Water at Melbourne's Sing Sing Studios. The four track EP was released in 2009, with the title track becoming The Australians song of the week. The next and final release for Rushcutter was 2010's "Foreign Soil" - ("a classic rock sound, with a contemporary pop-rock twist" The Music Network). After touring Australia, Rushcutter split due to "creative differences" and Reyne returned to his solo career, touring Australia with Pat Benatar and The Bangles, as well as playing shows with Cloud Control, Thirsty Merc and Richard Clapton. His debut solo single "Remember To Breathe" ("a fine slice slice of rollicking pop" Jeff Jenkins, Inpress) was released in 2011. Reyne toured "Remember To Breathe" throughout Australia and the US.

Acting career
Reyne has appeared on many television shows, including Neighbours (where he played Taj Coppin, first appearing in 2002), and Horace and Tina. His theatre and film productions include Diablo is Done For, Evolution, Snow White, and G7.
In 2016, Reyne played Dan Delaney in the television series The Secret Daughter alongside Jessica Mauboy.

Media and TV appearances
 Gamezville, Sky UK
 :sn:tv, Nickelodeon
 Postcards, Channel Nine (2009)
 Realmusic Bitz, Myspace (2009)
 The Naked Lentil, SBS (2010)
 Kids' WB, Go (2009 / 2011)
 Entertainment City, CityTV Canada (2012)
 Home and Away

DiscographySingles:
 "To Be Your Friend" – Green Media/MGM Distribution (JRRP301) (23 June 2006)
 "The Blonde Hotel" – Green Media/MGM Distribution (JRRP301) (2 March 2007)
 "Fallen Flower" – Green Media/MGM Distribution (JRRP301) (March 2007)
 "Call High Water" – Mercury/Universal (5 September 2009)
 "Remember To Breathe" – Fur Records/Valleyarm (9 May 2011)
 "Turtledove" – Valleyarm (14 November 2011)
 "Word Gets Around" – Valleyarm (13 July 2012)
 "Montgomery" – Valleyarm (21 January 2013)EPs:
 Call High Water – Mercury/Universal (2707065) (10 September 2009)
 Foreign Soil – Mercury/Universal (1 March 2010)
 Surrounded by the City – Valleyarm (6 April 2013)LPs:
 Tex Sessions - Independent (2005)
 Fallen Flower – Green Media/MGM Distribution (JRRP301) (March 2007)Compilations''':
 Discoveries – X Games
 Beer Blokes & BBQS, Vol. 3 - Mercury/Universal
 Painted Black: 50 Years of The Rolling Stones - Halcyon Records

See also
 The Secret Daughter: Songs from the Original TV Series''  (2016)

References

External links
 mp3.com.au
 tv.com profile
 yahoo gig guide
 Triple J Unearthed
 Rushcutter

1985 births
People educated at Carey Baptist Grammar School
Australian rock guitarists
Australian country guitarists
Australian male guitarists
Australian country singers
Australian people of Nigerian descent
Living people
Australian songwriters
21st-century Australian singers
21st-century guitarists
21st-century Australian male singers